Manari is a city  established in 1997 in the state of Pernambuco, Brazil. The population in 2020, according to the Brazilian Institute of Geography and Statistics, was 21,776 and the area is 344.73 km². In 2000, Manari had the lowest HDI of any municipality in the state.

Geography
 State - Pernambuco
 Region - Sertão Pernambucano
 Boundaries - Ibimirim (N); Alagoas state (S); Itaíba (E); Inajá (W)
 Area - 406.64 km²
 Elevation - 570 m
 Hydrography - Moxotó River and Ipanema River 
 Vegetation - Caatinga Hiperxerófila
 Climate - semi-arid, hot and dry
 Annual average temperature - 23.5 c
 Distance to Recife - 376 km

Economy

The main economic activities in Manari are based in agribusiness, especially the raising of sheep, goats, cattle,  and plantations of corn, beans and manioc.

Economic indicators

Economy by sector (2006)

Health indicators

References

External links 
http://www.contasnacional.com.br/pe/pmmanari
http://www.ferias.tur.br/informacoes/5337/manari-pe.html

Municipalities in Pernambuco